Nikkita Fountain (born 24 March 1984) is a Bahamian former professional tennis player.

Born in Nassau, Fountain appeared in a national record 36 Fed Cup ties for the Bahamas, winning 10 singles and 12 doubles rubbers. Debuting in 1999, she didn't feature in the side while at college between 2004 and 2007, then returned to the side and played until 2014. She competed in college tennis for Southern Nazarene University and Florida International University.

Fountain was a doubles gold medalist at the 2010 Central American and Caribbean Games, partnering Larika Russell. The final was decided by a third set match tie-break, which they mounted a comeback in to win 13–11 over their Dominican Republic opponents Daysi Espinal and Francesca Segarelli. 

At the 2010 Commonwealth Games in Delhi, Fountain was a quarter-finalist in the doubles and lost in the first round of the singles, to eighth seed Marina Erakovic of New Zealand.

References

External links
 
 
 

1984 births
Living people
Bahamian female tennis players
Sportspeople from Nassau, Bahamas
Competitors at the 2010 Central American and Caribbean Games
Central American and Caribbean Games gold medalists for the Bahamas
Central American and Caribbean Games medalists in tennis
Tennis players at the 2010 Commonwealth Games
Commonwealth Games competitors for the Bahamas